Connecticut's 33rd House of Representatives district elects one member of the Connecticut House of Representatives. It encompasses parts of Middletown and has been represented by Democrat Brandon Chafee since 2021.

Recent elections

2020

2018

2016

2014

2012

References

33